Salzburg castle may refer to:

 Salzburg Castle, a large castle in Franconia, Germany
 Hohensalzburg Fortress, a fortress in Salzburg, Austria